Megabelodon is an extinct gomphotherid genus of proboscid which inhabited North America in from the Miocene to the Pliocene. Specimens were found in Nevada and New Mexico. The genus has been disputed, with some paleontologists considering Megabelodon as a synonym of Gomphotherium.

References 

Gomphotheres
Prehistoric mammal genera